Celtic Woman 4 is the fourth release in a compilation series from Valley Entertainment that began in 1998.  The album brings songs, both original and traditional, from CDs released in Ireland, Scotland, and England to the United States.  It features many accomplished Celtic artists including Karen Matheson (of Capercaillie), Julie Fowlis, Kate Rusby, Back of the Moon, and more.

Track listing

References

External links
 [ Celtic Woman 4 on allmusic.com]
 Celtic Woman 4 on valley-entertainment.com

2010 compilation albums
Celtic compilation albums
New-age compilation albums
Folk compilation albums